Events of 2022 in Honduras.

Incumbents 

 President: Juan Orlando Hernández (until 27 January 2022); Xiomara Castro onwards
 President of the National Congress: Mauricio Oliva (until 25 January 2022); Luis Redondo onwards

Events 

 January 27 – Xiomara Castro is officially sworn in as the 56th President of Honduras, making her the country's first female president.
 February 6 – President Xiomara Castro tests positive for COVID-19. 
 February 14 –The United States Department of Justice asks Honduras for the arrest and extradition of former Honduran President Juan Orlando Hernández, who left office less than a month ago.
 February 15 – Former Honduran President Juan Orlando Hernández is arrested in Tegucigalpa after the U.S. requested his extradition on charges of drug trafficking. 
 March 28 – Courts decide that former Honduran President Juan Orlando Hernández will be extradited to the United States on drug trafficking charges.
 April 24 – Honduran President Xiomara Castro declares a state of emergency in the Colón Department following the death of three policemen in an ambush in Trujillo. The announced objective is to apprehend the perpetrators.
 July 6 – The government of Honduras releases a report stating that the deportation of Honduran migrants from Mexico and the United States increased by 84.4% during the first half of the year. 
 July 24 – Police in Honduras intensify their crackdown on gangs in response to last week's murder of the son of former president Porfirio Lobo Sosa.

Sports 

 2021–22 Honduran Liga Nacional

Deaths 

 March 11 – Guayo Cedeño, 48, musician and record producer, respiratory failure

See also 

COVID-19 pandemic in Honduras
2022 Atlantic hurricane season
Public holidays in Honduras

References

External links 

 
2020s in Honduras
Honduras
Honduras
Years of the 21st century in Honduras